The following lists events that happened during 1985 in Sri Lanka.

Incumbents
 President – J. R. Jayewardene
 Prime Minister – Ranasinghe Premadasa
 Chief Justice – Suppiah Sharvananda

Events
146 civilians are killed in the  Anuradhapura massacre occurred in Sri Lanka in 1985 and was carried out by the Liberation Tigers of Tamil Eelam. This was the largest massacre of Sinhalese civilians by the LTTE to date.
The 1985 Muttur massacre was the slaughter of Tamil civilians in the town of Muttur in Eastern Province, Sri Lanka.  The attack was coordinated by the Sri Lankan Military leaving 30-100 dead (civilians and militants) 
The Indian cricket team toured Sri Lanka from 25 August to 22 September 1985.

Notes 

a.  Gunaratna, Rohan. (1998). Pg.353, Sri Lanka's Ethnic Crisis and National Security, Colombo: South Asian Network on Conflict Research.

Sources
THE NORTHEAST SECRETARIAT ON HUMAN RIGHTS (NESOHR). Massacres of Tamils (1956-2008)p. 14–15. Chennai: Manitham Publishers, 2009.

References